3-Heptanone (butyl ethyl ketone), is a seven carbon ketone. It is a colorless liquid with a "green odor," also described to have a fruity scent. It is often used as a perfume/fragrance, as a solvent for cellulose, nitrocellulose, or vinyl resins, and as a synthetic building block in the preparation of other organic molecules.

Preparation
3-Heptanone is produced industrially through reductive condensation of propionaldehyde (propanal) with butanone (methyl ethyl ketone). This reaction yields hept-4-en-3-one, which is subsequently hydrogenated to 3-heptanone.

   +      →      +   

   +      →

References

Heptanones